The T K Group of Industries is a Bangladeshi industrial Conglomerate known for its vegetable oil business.  It also has interests in steel, shipbuilding, pulp and paper, plastics, cement, and textiles. The conglomerate is headquartered in Chittagong. The group is one of the top VAT payers in the country.

History
T. K. Group of Industries began its journey in 1972 in commodity trading. The entrepreneurial spirit of the founders helped the business grow and new ventures were launched in the manufacturing and marketing of consumer and industrial products. It is the largest producer of edible oil products in the country. The annual turnover of the group is over US$ 5 billion.

Enterprises
T.K group has around 20 major concerns:

Edible oil
 Bay Fishing Corporation Ltd.
 Shabnam Vegetable Oil Industries Ltd.
 Super Oil Refinery Ltd
Steel
 Karnafully (Galv) Mills Ltd.
 Karnafully Steel Mills Ltd.
Board
 Super Board Mills Limited
 Super Formica and Lamination Limited
 T. K. Chemical Complex Ltd.
Paper
 T. K. Paper Products Ltd.
 Progressive Containers Ltd.
Packaging & containers
 Samuda Containers Ltd.
 T. K. Gas and Gas Cylinder Ltd.
Tea
 Baramasia Tea Estate
 Elahinoor Tea Estate
 Rangapani Tea Estate
Textile
 Chin Hung Fibres Ltd.
Ship building
 T. K. Shipyard Limited
Trading & food
 T.K Consumer Products limited-has two admiring brands PUSTI and FAMILY.‘PUSTI’ is one of the leading consumer brands of Bangladesh from the house of T.K. Group of Industries. Being one of the largest conglomerates of the country, T.K. Group introduced ‘PUSTI’ to remain with the social commitment to the country-men. Keeping the promise in the core ‘PUSTI’ stands for “Products of Utmost Standard, Trust, and Innovations”. 
Shares & securities
 T.K. Shares & Securities Ltd.
Construction
 Tradevisor Limited
Vehicle
 MAF MOTORS

Associates enterprises
T.K Group of Industries has over 15 major associates business sectors:

 Samuda Chemical Complex Limited
 Super Knitting & Dying Mills Limited
 Super Thread Limited
 Super Synthetic Limited
 Mohammadi Trading Co. Limited
 Bangladesh Timber & Plywood Industries Limited
 MAF News Print Mills Limited
 MAF Shoes Limited
 Tradevisor Limited
 Modern Hatchery Limited
 Modern Power Co. Limited
 Modern Fibers Industries Limited
 Modern Polly Industries Limited
 Masud & Brothers
 Rubi Food Products Limited
 Uni-Trade
 Premier Cement Mills Limited
 Asia Insurance Limited
 Riff Leather Limited
 Tradevisor Limited
 MAF Motors

Achievements
T.K Group's brands had secured the heart of the people of Bangladesh for a few decades. This group has awarded many awards national and international since its journey began. It has been awarded many times as "Standard Chartered Trade Awards", "Best Brand Award"  for the contribution to the growth of the country's export and import market.

See also
 List of companies of Bangladesh

References

External links

Conglomerate companies established in 1972
Food and drink companies established in 1972
Conglomerate companies of Bangladesh
Food and drink companies of Bangladesh
Manufacturing companies based in Chittagong
Bangladeshi companies established in 1972